Laura Live World Tour 09 is the third live album by Italian singer Laura Pausini. It was recorded in different countries during her World Tour 2009. The album was released on 27 November 2009. For the first time, it was also published in the Spanish and Latin market, under the name Laura Live Gira Mundial 09.

Album information 
Laura Live was anticipated by the release of Laura Pausini's single Con la musica alla radio on 25 September 2009.

The CD version contains 18 tracks, where 15 of them were recorded on tour in different cities around the world. There are also 3 unpublished tracks which includes, Con la musica alla radio, Non sono lei and Casomai which was recorded live during a soundcheck in the Brazilian city of São Paulo. The DVD version of the album contains videos from concerts from the World Tour 2009, which includes 3 new videos and songs.

The Italian version of the CD was recorded in: Barletta, Bergamo, Cagliari, Florence, Milan, Monza, Naples, Palermo, Rome, Teramo, Turin, Verona, Barcelona, Brussels, Paris, Helsinki, Locarno, Malta, New York City and São Paulo.

The Spanish version of the CD was recorded in: Bergamo, Cagliari, Monza, Naples, Palermo, Rome, Turin, Verona, Barcelona, Mexico City, Paris, Helsinki, Hollywood, Florida, Los Angeles, Lima, Locarno, Madrid, New York City, São Paulo, Santiago and Santo Domingo

Track listing

Laura Live World Tour 2009

Disc 1 (CD)

Disc 2 (DVD)

Laura Live Gira Mundial 09

Disc 1 (CD)

Disc 2 (DVD)

Charts

Weekly charts

Year-end charts

Certifications and sales

References 

Laura Pausini live albums
Live video albums
2009 live albums
2009 video albums
Atlantic Records albums